NEW STATE Mobile (formerly PUBG: New State) is a futuristic style multiplayer online battle royale video game developed by PUBG Studios and published by Krafton. The game was released on November 11, 2021, for iOS and Android through the App Store (iOS/iPadOS), Google Play and Samsung Galaxy Store. It is the second installment in the PUBG Universe, separated from PUBG: Battlegrounds and its mobile version.

As of December 2021, the game surpassed 50 million downloads worldwide.

Gameplay 
In NEW STATE Mobile, 100 players are deployed by jumping out of a plane on a remote 8x8 island called Troi, the game's main map, to collect supplies and battle each other as they fight to survive, with the last one becoming the winner. Troi is set in the year 2051 in the northern United States, with a futuristic environment, buildings, architecture and monuments. New features include drones, ballistic shields, neon sights, combat balancing ability, reviving dead teammates, and "recruiting" downed enemies. Vehicles include futuristic cars, buggies, motorcycles, speedboats and gliders.

NEW STATE Mobile features interactive objects and structures with destructible windows and doors, and players can intersperse between a first person and third person perspective. It also features weapon customization with different firing mode selections, grenade launchers, grips, sights, silencers, and other types of weapon accessories.

The game has secondary 4v4 multiplayer modes, such as team deathmatch, where up to four weapon loadouts can be selected. It also features an updated "Erangel" map from the original PUBG.

Development 
In February 2021, PUBG Studios, an internal division of Krafton (the company that publishes the game) announced the development of a game codenamed "PUBG: New State", a separate entity to PUBG: Battlegrounds and its mobile version, set in the near-future (year 2051) as a part of the PUBG universe.

In July 2021, Krafton reported that the game surpassed 20 million pre-registrations on Google Play alone. On 28 August the alpha testing concluded after running in 28 countries, and the developers implemented improvements and fixes based on feedback from participating users. In September 2021, after pre-registration opened for iOS, the game surpassed more than 50 million pre-registrations combined on both Google Play and the App Store.

On January 27, 2022, a name change was announced, from "PUBG: New State" to "New State Mobile". The change was subsequently made effective on all platforms.

Release 
The game was released worldwide on November 11, 2021, for both iOS and Android.

Collaborations 
Beginning with the game's first season, Krafton has collaborated with the Croatian car manufacturer Rimac. Also, the game collaborated with McLaren in March 2022, Among Us in April 2022, and Dead by Daylight in October 2022.

References

External links
 

2021 video games
Android (operating system) games
Battle royale games
Mobile games
IOS games
Multiplayer video games
Open-world video games
Esports games
Survival video games
Tactical shooter video games
Third-person shooters
Unreal Engine games
Video games containing battle passes
Video games containing loot boxes
Video games developed in South Korea
Video games set in the 2050s
Video games set in the United States
Video games set on fictional islands